Agyneta saaristoi is a species of sheet weaver found in Russia and Kazakhstan. It was described by Tanasevitch in 2000.

References

saaristoi
Spiders described in 2000
Spiders of Russia
Spiders of Asia